Arthur E. "Doc" Austin (January 22, 1891 – December 1, 1976) was a member of the Wisconsin State Assembly.

Biography
Austin was born on January 22, 1891, in Lowville, Wisconsin. He married Ethel Mae Cheney (1893–1987) in 1925. He died in 1976 in a Madison hospital.

Career
Austin was a member of the Assembly from 1939 to 1946. He was a Republican.

References

People from Columbia County, Wisconsin
Republican Party members of the Wisconsin State Assembly
1891 births
1976 deaths
20th-century American politicians